Plečkaitis is  a Lithuanian surname. Notable people with the surname include:

Jeronimas Plečkaitis (1887–1963), Lithuanian teacher and politician
Joe Pleckaitis, Canadian ice-hockey player
Romanas Plečkaitis, Lithuanian philosopher
Vidmantas Plečkaitis, Lithuanian artist and politician
Michael Pleckaitis, American environment activist. 

Lithuanian-language surnames